The 2012 Bitburger Open Grand Prix Gold was the thirtieth grand prix gold and grand prix tournament of the 2012 BWF Grand Prix Gold and Grand Prix. The tournament was held in Saarlandhalle, Saarbrücken, Germany October 30 until November 4, 2012, and had a total purse of $120,000.

Men's singles

Seeds

  Hans-Kristian Vittinghus (third round)
  Marc Zwiebler (final)
  Rajiv Ouseph (semi-final)
  Hsu Jen-hao (first round)
  Chou Tien-chen (champion)
  Mohd Arif Abdul Latif (semi-final)
  Henri Hurskainen (third round)
  Ville Lang (quarter-final)
  Dmytro Zavadsky (first round)
  Brice Leverdez (second round)
  Andre Kurniawan Tedjono (quarter-final)
  Joachim Persson (first round)
  Valeriy Atrashchenkov (first round)
  Eric Pang (quarter-final)
  Misha Zilberman (first round)
  Michael Lahnsteiner (second round)

Finals

Top half

Section 1

Section 2

Section 3

Section 4

Bottom half

Section 5

Section 6

Section 7

Section 8

Women's singles

Seeds

  Juliane Schenk (champion)
  Yao Jie (final)
  Petya Nedelcheva (semi-final)
  Carolina Marin (semi-final)
  Tee Jing Yi (second round)
  Michelle Chan Ky (second round)
  Karin Schnaase (quarter-final)
  Sashina Vignes Waran (quarter-final)

Finals

Top half

Section 1

Section 2

Bottom half

Section 3

Section 4

Men's doubles

Seeds

  Mathias Boe / Carsten Mogensen (withdrew)
  Ingo Kindervater / Johannes Schöttler (champion)
  Chris Adcock / Andrew Ellis (semi-final)
  Michael Fuchs / Oliver Roth (second round)
  Yonathan Suryatama / Hendra Aprida Gunawan (quarter-final)
  Jurgen Koch / Peter Zauner (quarter-final)
  Lukasz Moren / Wojciech Szkudlarczyk (quarter-final)
  Jorrit de Ruiter / Dave Khodabux (second round)

Finals

Top half

Section 1

Section 2

Bottom half

Section 3

Section 4

Women's doubles

Seeds

  Shinta Mulia Sari / Yao Lei (semi-final)
  Vivian Hoo Kah Mun / Woon Khe Wei (quarter-final)
  Emma Wengberg / Emelie Lennartsson (first round)
  Selena Piek / Iris Tabeling (first round)
  Jillie Cooper / Kirsty Gilmour (second round)
  Line Damkjaer Kruse / Lena Grebak (withdrew)
  Kamila Augustyn / Agnieszka Wojtkowska (withdrew)
  Steffi Annys / Severine Corvilain (first round)

Finals

Top half

Section 1

Section 2

Bottom half

Section 3

Section 4

Mixed doubles

Seeds

  Robert Mateusiak / Nadiezda Zieba (final)
  Chris Adcock /  Imogen Bankier (withdrew)
  Danny Bawa Chrisnanta / Vanessa Neo Yu Yan (semi-final)
  Michael Fuchs / Birgit Michels (semi-final)
  Marcus Ellis / Gabrielle White (first round)
  Anthony Dumartheray / Sabrina Jaquet (first round)
  Dave Khodabux / Selena Piek (quarter-final)
  Anders Kristiansen / Julie Houmann (champion)

Finals

Top half

Section 1

Section 2

Bottom half

Section 3

Section 4

References

SaarLorLux Open
2012 in German sport
Sport in Saarbrücken
Biburger Open
BWF Grand Prix Gold and Grand Prix